Sarah Hirini  (born 9 December 1992) is a New Zealand women's rugby union player and two-time Olympic medalist. She plays for the New Zealand women's national rugby sevens team, and captained the Manawatu Sevens side that took out the 2013 National Women's Sevens title in Queenstown. She was named in the squad for the 2017 Women's Rugby World Cup.

Early life
Hirini was born on 9 December 1992 to Ronnie and Alan Goss. Her sister Rachael Rakatau also plays rugby and played for the Manawatū Cyclones in the Farah Palmer Cup championship in 2021

Her father Alan was a champion shearer who won a Golden Shears title in the 1985 intermediate shearing final.
Her mother Ronnie was a master wool handler, winning 53 open finals, including the 2008 Golden Shears open title, as well as competing in the New Zealand open championships finals in Te Kuiti in 1999 and 2003, in the Golden Shears open final six times, the 2014 world championships in Ireland, and represented New Zealand in ten trans-Tasman wool handling test matches.
She grew up in a sports-loving household in the Oroua Valley, just out of Feilding. Her secondary school education was undertaken at Feilding High School, where she boarded.

When she was young Hirini competed in shearing contests alongside her brother Simon.
After leaving high school having obtained a scholarship she commenced full time studies at Massey University, undertaking a Bachelor of Arts in Māori and sports science.  However following selection for the national Sevens team, for the next eight years she completed her studies part-time, graduating with a degree in Maori studies.

Rugby career
At secondary school she initially played field hockey, but began playing rugby after she accompanied some friends who were attending rugby tryouts. “I thought it’d be good fitness for my hockey and also, if I did one more sport I didn’t have to go to homework class after school.”

At the end of her secondary education she was so passionate about rugby that she wanted to play it  full time, but with no obvious professional career path for women in rugby, she continued played it as amateur.

In 2012 the New Zealand Rugby Union organized a nationwide “Go for Gold” grassroots initiative to identify talent with the potential to represent New Zealand in the Sevens competition at the 2016 Summer Olympics, where rugby sevens was making its debut.

Hirini who was in her second year of study at Massey University at the time, attended one of the trials where along with the other participants she was put through various fitness, speed, rugby skill and character assessment activities. Of the 800 who attended a trial, Hirini was among the 30 deemed promising who attended a training camp at Waiouru in mid-2012.

2012-2013 Seven Series Season
Hirini was selected to join Lauren Burgess, Marama Davis, Lavinia Gould, Carla Hohepa, Chyna Hohepa, [Linda Itunu]], Kayla McAlister, Huriana Manuel (captain), Tyla Nathan Wong, Amanda Rasch and Portia Woodman in New Zealand’s team for inaugural 2012–13 IRB Women's Sevens World Series. As a result Hirini obtained a full time one year New Zealand Sevens contract, which paid $30,000. Captained by Manuel the team won the series following a fourth at  Houston and wins at  Guangzhou and  Amsterdam having scored 169 points and conceded 34.

2020 Tokyo Olympic Games
Hirini was selected as a playing member of the Black Ferns Sevens for the Rugby sevens at the 2020 Summer Olympics.
She was then selected to join Hamish Bond in being New Zealand's flagbearers at the opening ceremony. Due to a racing the next day Bond was replaced by David Nyika.
Due to Covid restrictions on how many could enter the Olympic Village at a time eleven of the players and management including Hirini were due to fly from Townsville, where they had been competing in the 2021 Oceania Women's Sevens Championship) in order to ensure Hirini would be able to attend the opening ceremony. They would be joined later by the rest of the team.
After their first flight was cancelled the eleven missed their connection in Brisbane, which led to their 24-hour pre-departure tests expiring.  Eventually a way was found of getting Hirani accompanied by Portia Woodman to Tokyo in time to participate in the opening ceremony.

2022 Birmingham Commonwealth Games
Hirini was named in the Black Ferns Sevens squad for the 2022 Commonwealth Games in Birmingham. She won a bronze medal at the event. She also won a silver medal at the Rugby World Cup Sevens in Cape Town.

2021 World Cup
Hirini was a member of the Black Ferns 32-player squad for the 2021 Rugby World Cup. She scored a try in the final pool game against a scoreless Scotland who were beaten 57–0. She also scored a try against Wales in the quarterfinals. She played in the semi-final against France and then the final in which the Black Ferns bet England to become World Champions.

Awards and honours 
In 2013, she received the Massey University Manawatu campus sportswoman of-the-year award. 

In the 2019 Queen's Birthday Honours, Hirini was appointed a Member of the New Zealand Order of Merit, for services to rugby. She was nominated, for the fourth time in six years, as the World Rugby Women's Sevens Player of the Year.

She was the first woman to play 200 matches in the global circuit. Her mother, sister and niece made the trip to the south of France to witness her 200th game.

In 2022, she became the third woman to appear on the cover of the New Zealand Rugby Almanack.

Personal life
Of Māori descent, She affiliates to the Ngāti Kahungunu iwi.
She married Conor Hirini in January 2019. 

While based at Mount Maunganui she obtained her private pilot’s license in 2021, after three years of study.

References

External links
 
 
 All Blacks Profile

1992 births
Living people
Rugby sevens players at the 2016 Summer Olympics
Olympic rugby sevens players of New Zealand
New Zealand female rugby union players
New Zealand women's international rugby union players
New Zealand female rugby sevens players
New Zealand women's international rugby sevens players
New Zealand Māori rugby union players
Ngāti Kahungunu people
Massey University alumni
People educated at Feilding High School
Olympic silver medalists for New Zealand
Olympic medalists in rugby sevens
Medalists at the 2016 Summer Olympics
Manawatu rugby union players
Rugby sevens players at the 2018 Commonwealth Games
Commonwealth Games rugby sevens players of New Zealand
Commonwealth Games gold medallists for New Zealand
Commonwealth Games medallists in rugby sevens
Members of the New Zealand Order of Merit
Rugby sevens players at the 2020 Summer Olympics
Medalists at the 2020 Summer Olympics
Olympic gold medalists for New Zealand
People from Feilding
20th-century New Zealand women
21st-century New Zealand women
Rugby sevens players at the 2022 Commonwealth Games
Medallists at the 2018 Commonwealth Games
Medallists at the 2022 Commonwealth Games